Genoa (pron. je NO uh) is a city in Nance County, Nebraska, United States. The population was 1,003 at the 2010 census. The city was founded by Mormons in 1857. In the fall of 1859, the Mormon Colony was forced to abandon Genoa when the town and surrounding area were incorporated into the newly created Pawnee Reservation. The Pawnee Indian Agency utilized the structures vacated by the Mormons.

Geography
Genoa is located at  (41.45, -97.73).

Climate

Demographics

2010 census
As of the census of 2010, there were 1,003 people, 408 households, and 234 families living in the city. The racial makeup of the city was 96.6% White, 0.1% African American, 0.4% Native American, 0.2% Asian, 1.0% from other races, and 1.7% from two or more races. Hispanic or Latino of any race were 3.4% of the population.

There were 408 households, of which 27.7% had children under the age of 18 living with them, 46.3% were married couples living together, 7.1% had a female householder with no husband present, 3.9% had a male householder with no wife present, and 42.6% were non-families. 38.5% of all households were made up of individuals, and 15.5% had someone living alone who was 65 years of age or older. The average household size was 2.29 and the average family size was 3.03.

The median age in the city was 40.7 years. 23.4% of residents were under the age of 18; 8.3% were between the ages of 18 and 24; 22.3% were from 25 to 44; 29% were from 45 to 64; and 17.2% were 65 years of age or older. The gender makeup of the city was 49.8% male and 50.2% female.

2000 census
As of the census of 2000, there were 981 people, 411 households, and 247 families living in the city. The population density was 1,237.9 people per square mile (479.5/km2). There were 442 housing units at an average density of 557.8 per square mile (216.0/km2). The racial makeup of the city was 98.37% White, 0.31% Native American, 0.10% Asian, 0.31% from other races, and 0.92% from two or more races. Hispanic or Latino of any race were 0.71% of the population.

There were 411 households, out of which 31.1% had children under the age of 18 living with them, 49.6% were married couples living together, 6.3% had a female householder with no husband present, and 39.7% were non-families. 36.3% of all households were made up of individuals, and 20.0% had someone living alone who was 65 years of age or older. The average household size was 2.29 and the average family size was 3.00.

In the city, the population was spread out, with 26.5% under the age of 18, 8.4% from 18 to 24, 23.4% from 25 to 44, 20.4% from 45 to 64, and 21.3% who were 65 years of age or older. The median age was 40 years. For every 100 females, there were 101.4 males. For every 100 females age 18 and over, there were 100.3 males.

As of 2000 the median income for a household in the city was $31,023, and the median income for a family was $38,988. Males had a median income of $26,250 versus $18,929 for females. The per capita income for the city was $16,980. About 6.6% of families and 10.8% of the population were below the poverty line, including 16.1% of those under age 18 and 8.2% of those age 65 or over.

Education
Genoa is home to Twin River Public Schools, formed by consolidating the school districts of three communities: Genoa, Monroe, and Silver Creek.  The district has elementary schools in Silver Creek and Genoa, the latter serving students from Monroe; it has one junior high and high school, in Genoa.

Genoa was also home to the Genoa Indian Industrial School, an American Indian boarding school.

Notable people
 Glen "Frosty" Little
 Samuel F. Tappan
Wyatt Drozd

See also 
 Genoa Indian Industrial School
 Pawnee people

References

Cities in Nebraska
Cities in Nance County, Nebraska
Populated places established in 1857
1857 establishments in Nebraska Territory